Pedro María Zabalza Inda (born 13 April 1944) is a Spanish former professional football midfielder and manager.

His career was mostly associated with Osasuna, especially as a coach. As a player, he amassed La Liga totals of 206 matches and 12 goals over nine seasons, with Barcelona and Athletic Bilbao.

Club career
Born in Pamplona, Navarre, Zabalza started playing professionally with local side CA Osasuna, appearing in three Segunda División season in their representation and scoring a career-best ten goals in 1965–66 to help to the ninth place. In the summer of 1967 he moved to La Liga, signing with FC Barcelona and making his debut in the competition on 10 September in a 2–3 away loss to Real Zaragoza.

During his six-year spell at the Camp Nou, Zabalza played 194 competitive games and netted 15 times, helping to win two Copa del Generalísimo trophies and scoring twice in the 1971 final against Valencia CF. After three further top-flight campaigns with Athletic Bilbao, he closed out his career at the age of 33 with Osasuna, now competing in Tercera División.

After taking over from Ivica Brzić 11 rounds into 1986–87, Zabalza went on to coach his last club over a full six seasons in the top tier. He resigned in December 1993 as they rank third from bottom in the table, eventually being relegated as last.

Zabalza began 1995–96 at the helm of Rayo Vallecano, but after seven matches and six losses he was sacked. In the following campaign he was one of four managers in charge of Osasuna (the others being Rafael Benítez, Miguel Ángel Sola and Enrique Martín), who was the first team above the division two relegation zone.

International career
Zabalza earned seven caps for Spain, during eight months. His first occurred on 17 October 1968, in a 3–1 friendly win in France.

Honours
Barcelona
Copa del Generalísimo: 1967–68, 1970–71

References

External links

1944 births
Living people
Footballers from Pamplona
Spanish footballers
Association football midfielders
La Liga players
Segunda División players
Tercera División players
CD Oberena players
CA Osasuna players
FC Barcelona players
Athletic Bilbao footballers
Spain international footballers
Catalonia international guest footballers
Spanish football managers
La Liga managers
Segunda División managers
CA Osasuna managers
Rayo Vallecano managers